Gangolli Ramashet Nagaraj (16 July 1939 – 16 July 2013), popularly known as Shringar Nagaraj,  was an Indian actor, cameraman, and producer in Kannada cinema. He is best known for the 1987 silent film Pushpaka Vimana, which won the National Film Award for Best Popular Film Providing Wholesome Entertainment.

He was bestowed with Kannada Rajyotsava, Filmfare Awards, International Houston Film Festival Award and a few others.

Biography 
Born in Bangalore on 16 July 1939, he did a Bachelor of Commerce from MES College in Malleswaram and a Bachelor of Laws from Government Law College. He belongs to daivadnya Brahmin community. He has two sons and two daughters- Ramkumar, film actor and son-in-law of Rajkumar and Pranam, who is blessed with psychic insights.

He renounced his traditional gold jewellery profession with the imposition of the Gold Control Act and took up photography - His creative talent made him a very well known photographer in Bangalore. He was popular amongst celebrities in the film industry as a photographer as well as a cameraman, which led him to take up acting in the movies.

He got his first break in Kannada films as a supporting role opposite Rajkumar in Sipayi Ramu; besides, he acted in almost 25 Kannada films, such as Bangaaradha Manushya, Haalu Jenu, Chelisuva Modagalu, Shabdavedi and more. He also acted in other movies such as Ranganayaki and Katha Sangama. He acted as the hero opposite Kalpana in Kesarina Kamala.

He also owned and ran a travel agency called Shringar Tours. He has travelled all over the world and photographed beautiful scenes in his travels, which will soon be published.

His name to fame lies in the fact that when no one was willing to take the risk of making a silent film, he took up that challenge and produced the award-winning Pushpaka Vimana, a silent film, starring Kamal Haasan that won the National Film Award for Best Popular Film Providing Wholesome Entertainment, the President's gold medal, and also the critics applause.

Awards 

 Kannada Rajyotsava in 1999.
 Filmfare Awards in 1989.
 Screen Award.

Notes

External links 
 

1939 births
2013 deaths
Male actors from Bangalore
Landscape artists
Kannada male actors
Kannada film producers
Indian male film actors
Male actors in Kannada cinema
Film producers from Bangalore
Producers who won the Best Popular Film Providing Wholesome Entertainment National Film Award